The Fourth ARMM Regional Legislative Assembly was a meeting of the unicameral regional legislature of the Autonomous Region in Muslim Mindanao.

The fourth assembly experienced a leadership crisis involving the position of Assembly Speaker in 2003. Ibrahim Ibay's post as speaker was placed into dispute, when Ismael Abubakar of Tawi-Tawi with the support of 12 assemblyman held an unannounced session in which they declared the position of assembly speaker vacant with the present assemblymen electing Abubakar as speaker. Abraham Burahan was elected as speaker in a special session in August 2003 and was supported by 13 assemblymen including Ibay.

Members

See also
Autonomous Region in Muslim Mindanao
ARMM Regional Legislative Assembly

References

ARMM Regional Legislative Assembly by legislative period